Mediapoint Pty Ltd is an Australian advertising-printing service, founded in 2006 by brothers Jason and Jamie Xuereb.

Three years later, Mediapoint has a thriving factory in western Melbourne and Xuereb, 21, has been named winner of the Australian round of the 2009 Global Student Entrepreneur Awards, a program that has been running for about 20 years. He will now compete in the international final of the awards, to be held in the US, in November . Mediapoint has more than 600 clients, a 500 square meter factory .

External links
 Brothers persist as downturn bites advertisers
 Printing Start-Up Media Point Looks to Expand 
 Young entrepreneurs tell Australians to toughen up on the global financial crisis
 Small business heroes take a bow - RMIT University, Australia
 Digital masters start with $500: Mediapoints
 Network Ten - Video

See also
 

Marketing companies of Australia
Companies based in Melbourne
Australian companies established in 2006
Marketing companies established in 2006